Doo Wopper is a steel roller coaster on the Surfside Pier of Morey's Piers amusement park in New Jersey. The attraction appeared along with Rollies Coaster, The Storm, and Shark Bite, one of which is defunct. The Doo Wopper was relocated from the Adventure Pier to Surfside Pier where it replaced the RC-48.  A S&S Screaming Swing took the Doo Wopper's former space on Adventure Pier. The Doo Wooper is a wild mouse type of roller coaster. This ride has undulating hills and is a modern version of a classic wild mouse coaster. The ride costs five tickets to ride. Morey's Piers has rated this ride as a moderate type of roller coaster.

Doo Wopper was originally located at the Adventure Pier (formerly Wild Wheels) then moved to Surfside Pier.

The theme of the Doo Wopper is set to the 1950s and has props of a typical drive-thru in a fast food restaurant.

References

External links
 Morey's Piers

Morey's Piers
Roller coasters in New Jersey